In mathematics, Doob's martingale inequality, also known as Kolmogorov’s submartingale inequality is a result in the study of stochastic processes. It gives a bound on the probability that a submartingale exceeds any given value over a given interval of time. As the name suggests, the result is usually given in the case that the process is a martingale, but the result is also valid for submartingales.

The inequality is due to the American mathematician Joseph L. Doob.

Statement of the inequality
The setting of Doob's inequality is a submartingale relative to a filtration of the underlying probability space.

Informally, Doob's inequality states that the expected value of the process at some final time controls the probability that a sample path will reach above any particular value beforehand. As the proof uses very direct reasoning, it does not require any restrictive assumptions on the underlying filtration or on the process itself, unlike for many other theorems about stochastic processes. In the continuous-time setting, right-continuity (or left-continuity) of the sample paths is required, but only for the sake of knowing that the supremal value of a sample path equals the supremum over an arbitrary countable dense subset of times.

Discrete time
Let  be a discrete-time submartingale relative to a filtration  of the underlying probability space, which is to say:

The submartingale inequality says that 

for any positive number . Then

having made use of the submartingale property for the last inequality and the fact that  for the last equality. Summing this result as  ranges from 1 to  results in the conclusion

which is sharper than the stated result. By using the elementary fact that , the given submartingale inequality follows.

In this proof, the submartingale property is used once, together with the definition of conditional expectation. The proof can also be phrased in the language of stochastic processes so as to become a corollary of the powerful theorem that a stopped submartingale is itself a submartingale. In this setup, the minimal index  appearing in the above proof is interpreted as a stopping time.

Continuous time
Now let  be a submartingale indexed by an interval  of real numbers, relative to a filtration  of the underlying probability space, which is to say:

for all  The submartingale inequality says that if the sample paths of the martingale are almost-surely right-continuous, then

for any positive number . This is a corollary of the above discrete-time result, obtained by writing

The first equality is a consequence of the right-continuity assumption, while the second equality is only set-theoretic. The discrete-time inequality applies to say that

for each , and this passes to the limit to yield the submartingale inequality. As such, the submartingale inequality holds even for more general index sets, which are not required to be intervals or natural numbers.

Further inequalities
There are further submartingale inequalities also due to Doob. Now let  be a martingale or a positive submartingale; if the index set is uncountable, then (as above) assume that the sample paths are right-continuous. In these scenarios, Jensen's inequality implies that  is a submartingale for any number , provided that these new random variables all have finite integral. The submartingale inequality is then applicable to say that

for any positive number . Here  is the final time, i.e. the largest value of the index set. Furthermore one has

if  is larger than one. This, sometimes known as Doob's maximal inequality, is a direct result of combining the layer cake representation with the submartingale inequality and the Hölder inequality.

In addition to the above inequality, there holds

Related inequalities
Doob's inequality for discrete-time martingales implies Kolmogorov's inequality: if X1, X2, ... is a sequence of real-valued independent random variables, each with mean zero, it is clear that

so Sn = X1 + ... + Xn is a martingale. Note that Jensen's inequality implies that |Sn| is a nonnegative submartingale if Sn is a martingale. Hence, taking p = 2 in Doob's martingale inequality,

which is precisely the statement of Kolmogorov's inequality.

Application: Brownian motion
Let B denote canonical one-dimensional Brownian motion. Then

The proof is just as follows: since the exponential function is monotonically increasing, for any non-negative λ,

By Doob's inequality, and since the exponential of Brownian motion is a positive submartingale,

Since the left-hand side does not depend on λ, choose λ to minimize the right-hand side: λ = C/T gives the desired inequality.

References

Sources

External Links
 

Probabilistic inequalities
Statistical inequalities
Martingale theory